The Lady and Her Hairdresser (German: Die Dame und ihr Friseur) is a 1922 German silent comedy film directed by Heinz Ullstein and starring Eugen Rex and Maly Delschaft and Hans Junkermann.

Cast
In alphabetical order
 Paul Bildt as Beamter 
 Maly Delschaft
 Hugo Döblin as Papierhändler Hollmann 
 Hans Junkermann as Bankier Markus 
 Heinrich Peer
 Hermann Picha as Theaterfriseur 
 Eugen Rex as Titular-Friseur 
 Aenne Ullstein

References

Bibliography
 Grange, William. Cultural Chronicle of the Weimar Republic. Scarecrow Press, 2008.

External links

1922 films
Films of the Weimar Republic
Films directed by Heinz Ullstein
German silent feature films
German black-and-white films
1922 comedy films
German comedy films
Silent comedy films
1920s German films
1920s German-language films